Hendudur (also Romanized as Hendūdūr; also known as Hanūdār, Hendūdar, Henūdar, and Hindūdar) is a city and capital of Sarband District, in Shazand County, Markazi Province, Iran.  At the 2006 census, its population was 1,863 in 523 families.

References

Populated places in Shazand County

Cities in Markazi Province